Shahrak-e Sartang (also known as Shahrak-e Jomhūrī-ye Eslāmī-ye Sartang and Shahrak-e Sartang-e Zangūn) is a village in Zangvan Rural District, Karezan District, Sirvan County, Ilam Province, Iran. At the 2006 census, its population was 967, in 208 families. The village is populated by Kurds.

References 

Populated places in Sirvan County
Kurdish settlements in Ilam Province